Axel Eddy Lucien Jonkheer Merckx (born 8 August 1972) is a Belgian former professional road bicycle racer and the son of five-time Tour de France champion Eddy Merckx. He is team director of UCI Continental team .

In his professional career (1993–2007), he won the Belgian national road race championship in 2000 and a bronze medal in the road race at the 2004 Olympic Games in Athens.

Cycling career
Born in Uccle, Axel Merckx became a professional cyclist in 1993, winning the Belgian national road race championship in 2000. He vowed to make his mark by accomplishing feats that had eluded his father, such as winning a Tour de France stage at Alpe d'Huez and the Paris–Tours classic. He did not succeed, but competed in eight Tours de France and finished as the highest-placed Belgian rider six times. His personal best was cracking the top 10 during the 1998 edition.

Merckx won the bronze medal in the road race at the 2004 Games in Athens, breaking free in the final kilometre.

During the 2006 Tour de France, Merckx announced that he signed a new contract for one extra season with Phonak, later renamed iShares. He stated that this would be his last season as a professional road bicycle racer. However, after Phonak announced that it would stop sponsoring the cycling team, Merckx signed a contract with Team T-Mobile, where he had started his professional career. During the 2006 Tour Merckx was instrumental in forcing the pace of the peloton for teammate Floyd Landis who won the Tour. He was oftentimes the only teammate able to stay with Landis and the group of favorites and he initially finished 31st overall, however it was later discovered that Landis had failed a doping control after stage 17 and the Tour win was revoked.

Merckx announced his retirement from professional cycling at the end of the 2007 Tour de France. He won his last race at Lommel, in August 2007.

He created the Granfondo Axel Merckx National Series, with its inaugural event being the Granfondo Axel Merckx Okanagan on 10 July 2011 in Penticton, British Columbia. His father, Eddy, rode in the inaugural event.

His name was on the list of doping tests published by the French Senate on 24 July 2013 that were collected during the 1998 Tour de France then retested in 2004. Merckx was not one of then 18 Riders named as testing positive for EPO but was on a list of 12 named riders whose test results were listed as  "suspicious".

Merckx is currently the owner and directeur sportif of the  team.

Personal life
Merckx married Canadian triathlete Jodi Cross in 1997, and currently resides in Kelowna, British Columbia. They have two children, Axana (born 5 May 2001) and Athina Grace (born 29 June 2005).

Because his father was made a baron—a personal, hereditary title—in Belgium, Axel Merckx has also been ennobled. He is therefore officially referred to as Écuyer (in French) or  Jonkheer (in Dutch) Axel Merckx. This honorific title is comparable to the British The Honourable, when the untitled person is the offspring of a baron, earl or viscount.

Major results

1992
 1st Stage 9 Tour de l'Avenir
1995
 2nd Sint-Truiden
 6th Overall Tour Méditerranéen
 8th Overall Danmark Rundt
1996
 1st GP Sanson
 3rd Giro di Lombardia
 4th Road race, UCI Road World Championships
 6th Brabantse Pijl
 7th Liège–Bastogne–Liège
1998
 2nd Overall Bayern Rundfahrt
1st Stage 3
 2nd Clásica de San Sebastián
 2nd Subida Urkiola
 10th Overall Tour de France
1999
 3rd Road race, National Road Championships
 4th Tour du Haut Var
 9th Overall Tour Méditerranéen
2000
 1st  Road race, National Road Championships
 1st  Overall Tour de la Région Wallonne
 1st Stage 8 Giro d'Italia
 3rd Châteauroux Classic
 4th Overall Rheinland-Pfalz Rundfahrt
 5th Liège–Bastogne–Liège
 5th Tour du Haut Var
 7th Overall Tour Méditerranéen
 9th Overall Volta a Catalunya
 10th La Flèche Wallonne
2001
 1st Grand Prix de Wallonie
 1st Ronde d'Aix-en-Provence
 3rd Brabantse Pijl
 5th Trofeo Laigueglia
 7th Coppa Sabatini
 7th Route Adélie de Vitré
2002
 2nd Overall Vuelta a Andalucía
 6th La Flèche Wallonne
2003
 1st  Overall Tour de l'Ain
 3rd Overall Rheinland-Pfalz Rundfahrt
 3rd Overall Hessen–Rundfahrt
 4th Overall Tour of Belgium
2004
 3rd  Road race, Olympic Games
 5th Brabantse Pijl
2005
 1st Stage 5 Critérium du Dauphiné Libéré
 3rd Brabantse Pijl

References

External links
 
 

1972 births
Living people
People from Uccle
Belgian male cyclists
Belgian Giro d'Italia stage winners
Olympic cyclists of Belgium
Cyclists at the 2000 Summer Olympics
Cyclists at the 2004 Summer Olympics
Olympic bronze medalists for Belgium
Belgian nobility
Olympic medalists in cycling
Medalists at the 2004 Summer Olympics
Eddy Merckx
Cyclists from Brussels